Howard "Howie" Bryant (born November 25, 1968) is a sports journalist, and radio and television personality. He writes weekly columns for ESPN.com and ESPN The Magazine, ESPN, and appears regularly on ESPN Radio. He is a frequent panelist on The Sports Reporters and since 2006 has been the sports correspondent for Weekend Edition with Scott Simon on National Public Radio.

Journalism career
A native of Boston, Bryant began his career in 1991 with the Oakland Tribune covering sports and technology, before moving to the San Jose Mercury News from 1995 to 2001. In San Jose, Bryant covered the telecommunications industry before returning to sports to cover the Oakland Athletics. He then reported for the Bergen Record from 2001 to 2002, covering the New York Yankees, before joining the Boston Herald as a columnist from 2002 to 2005. Bryant left the Herald for the Washington Post, where he covered the Washington Redskins from 2005 to 2007. He joined ESPN in August 2007.

Books and film appearances
In 2002, Bryant published his first book, Shut Out: A Story of Race and Baseball in Boston, which won the CASEY Award for the best baseball book of 2002 and was a finalist for the Society for American Baseball Research's Seymour Medal. In 2005, he published 
Juicing the Game: Drugs, Power, and the Fight for the Soul of Major League Baseball, which was New York Times Notable Book of 2005. The Last Hero: A Life of Henry Aaron was published in 2010, which also won the CASEY Award and was a New York Times Notable Book of 2010.

Bryant appeared in The Tenth Inning, Ken Burns's extension of his 1994 documentary Baseball.

Bryant was arrested in 2011 for allegedly assaulting his wife in front of their then 6-year-old son.

Works
Shut Out: A Story of Race and Baseball in Boston (2003) 
Juicing the Game: Drugs, Power, and the Fight for the Soul of Major League Baseball (2006) 
The Last Hero: A Life of Henry Aaron (2010) 
The Heritage: Black Athletes, a Divided America, and the Politics of Patriotism (2018) 
Full Dissidence: Notes from an Uneven Playing Field  (2020) 
Rickey: The Life and Legend of an American Original  (2022)

References

External links
 Official website
 ESPN bio
 Radio Interview with Howard Bryant on "Read First, Ask Later" (Ep. 13)
 

Living people
African-American sports journalists
American sports journalists
American sports radio personalities
African-American television personalities
Oakland Tribune people
The Washington Post people
Writers from Boston
Temple University alumni
San Francisco State University alumni
ESPN people
1968 births
The Mercury News people
Sportswriters from California
Sportswriters from Massachusetts